Noi siamo angeli (English: We are Angels) is an Italian action-comedy television series starring Bud Spencer and Philip Michael Thomas.

Cast

Bud Spencer: Bob / Father Orso
Philip Michael Thomas: Joe / Father Zaccaria
Kabir Bedi: Napoleon Duarte
David Hess: Captain Delgado
Mark Macaulay: Medina
Philippe Leroy: Duval
Renato Scarpa: Father Campana
Erik Estrada: Professor Graziani
Carlo Reali: President Aneto
Ty Hardin: The Exorcist 
Richard Lynch: Don Alfonso Santiana
Ramon Grado: Ortega

Episodes 
We Are Angels - 01 - Jailbait
We Are Angels - 02 - We Finally Take Off
We Are Angels - 03 - Romancing Eldorado
We Are Angels - 04 - Good Luck Comes From The Sky
We Are Angels - 05 - Dollars
We Are Angels - 06 - Dust

links 
 

Italian television series
1997 Italian television series debuts
1997 Italian television series endings
1990s Italian television series
RAI original programming